Ninaivil Nindraval may refer to:

 Ninaivil Nindraval (1967 film), the 1967 film
 Ninaivil Nindraval (2014 film), the 2014 film